Xanthostemoneae is a tribe in the plant family Myrtaceae. from Australia, New Caledonia, New Guinea, Solomon Islands, eastern Indonesia and the Philippines.

Genera 

Xanthostemon
Pleurocalyptus
Purpureostemon

References

Rosid tribes
Myrtaceae